Ramalingam Pathmarajah (born 14 February 1948) is a Malaysian field hockey player. He competed at the 1972 Summer Olympics and the 1976 Summer Olympics.

References

External links

1948 births
Living people
Malaysian people of Tamil descent
Malaysian sportspeople of Indian descent
Malaysian male field hockey players
Olympic field hockey players of Malaysia
Field hockey players at the 1972 Summer Olympics
Field hockey players at the 1976 Summer Olympics
Place of birth missing (living people)
Asian Games medalists in field hockey
Asian Games bronze medalists for Malaysia
Medalists at the 1974 Asian Games
Field hockey players at the 1974 Asian Games